Mory Kanté (29 March 195022 May 2020) was a Guinean vocalist and player of the kora harp. He was best known internationally for his 1987 hit song "Yé ké yé ké", which reached number-one in Belgium, Finland, the Netherlands, and Spain. The album it came from, Akwaba Beach, was the best-selling African record of its time.

Early life

Kanté was born in Albadaria, French Guinea (a part of French West Africa at the time) on 29 March 1950. His father was El Hadj Djeli Fodé Kanté and his mother, Fatouma Kamissoko, was a singer. They were one of Guinea's best known families of griot (hereditary) musicians. He was of mixed Malian and Guinean descent. After being brought up in the Mandinka griot tradition in Guinea, he was sent to Mali at the age of seven years – where he learned to play the kora, as well as important voice traditions, some of which are necessary to become a griot. As a Muslim, he integrated aspects of Islamic music in his work.

Career

In 1971 Kanté became a member of the Rail Band, in which Salif Keita was a singer. Keïta left the band in 1973, leaving Kanté as the singer.

In 1987, he released the song "Yé ké yé ké", which was one of Africa's best-ever selling hits as well as being a European number-one in 1988, making it the first ever African single to sell over one million copies. The album it came from, Akwaba Beach, became the best-selling African record of its time. The album also featured an Islamic song, "Inch Allah", alongside the pop hit "Yé ké yé ké". The album also featured the song "Tama", which inspired two Indian Bollywood songs, "Tamma Tamma" in Thanedaar (1990) and "Jumma Chumma" in Hum (1991), the latter film also featuring another song "Ek Doosre Se" which was inspired by "Inch Allah".

Kanté received unexpected fame again in 1994 when the German techno duo Hardfloor created a dance remix of "Yéké Yéké." He also appeared in 2006 as vocalist on British DJ Darren Tate's release, "Narama".

On 16 October 2001, Kanté was nominated Goodwill Ambassador of the Food and Agriculture Organization of the United Nations (FAO). He participated in that year's World Food Day ceremony at the FAO's headquarters in Rome, alongside fellow singers Majida El Roumi, Gilberto Gil, and Albano Carrisi (who were also nominated as ambassadors).

Kanté was among Africa's top musicians – including Tiken Jah Fakoly, Amadou & Mariam and the rapper Didier Awadi – that banded together for the recording of "Africa Stop Ebola", a song offering sound advice aimed at raising awareness in the wake of the Ebola crisis. The song, released in November 2014, transcended public service announcements and sold 250,000 copies with all proceeds going to medical charity Medecins Sans Frontieres (MSF).

Death

Kanté died on 22 May 2020 at a hospital in Conakry at the age of 70. He was suffering from chronic illnesses in the last years of his life and often received treatment in France. This ceased to be possible following the outbreak of the coronavirus pandemic in that country.   He is buried at Conakry Kipe's cemetery.

Selected discography

Source:

Albums

 Courougnegne (1981)
 N'Diarabi (1982)
 A Paris (1984)
 10 Cola Nuts (1986)
 Akwaba Beach (1987) (#1 SUI; #13 GER; #43 SWE)
 Touma (1990)
 Nongo Village (1993)
 Tatebola (1996)
 Tamala – Le Voyageur (2001)
 Best Of (2002)
 Sabou (2004)
 La Guinéenne (2012)

Contributing artist

 The Rough Guide to Acoustic Africa (2013, World Music Network)

Singles

 "Yé ké yé ké" (1988) (#1 in Belgium, the Netherlands, Spain, and Israel; #2 in Germany and Switzerland; #5 in France, #10 in Austria; #12 in Sweden; #29 in the UK)
 "Tama" (1988) (#44 in Germany)
 "Yéké Yéké" (remix) (1995) (#97 in Australia, #25 in the UK)
 "Yéké Yéké" (remix) (1996) (#28 in the UK)

References

External links

 Official website
 Mory Kanté at Mondomix
 Mory Kanté at Leopardmannen
 

1950 births
2020 deaths
Guinean Kora players
Guinean male singers
Guinean Muslims
21st-century Malian male singers
Malian Muslims
People from Faranah Region
20th-century Malian male singers